Tea Ugrin (born 12 June 1998 in Trieste) is an Italian artistic gymnast. She is the 2013 and 2015 Italian all-around champion. She was a member of the silver medal winning team at the 2012 Junior European Championships, and she competed at the 2015 European Games and the 2015 World Championships.

Career

Junior 
Ugrin made her international debut at the City of Jesolo Trophy where the junior Italian team won the silver medal behind the United States. She was selected to compete at the 2012 Junior European Championships alongside Elisa Meneghini, Enus Mariani, Lara Mori, and Alessia Leolini. They won the silver medal behind the Russian team. Ugrin tied for fourth place in the balance beam event final with Russian Evgenia Shelgunova.

At the 2013 City of Jesolo Trophy, the junior Italian team won the gold medal. Ugrin placed fourth in the all-around and on the balance beam. Then at the 2013 Italian Championships, Ugrin won the all-around, even beating the senior-level Italian gymnasts. She also won the gold medal on floor exercise and the bronze medal on the balance beam, and she placed fourth on the uneven bars. She was then selected to compete at the 2013 European Youth Summer Olympic Festival with Martina Rizzelli and Lara Mori, and they placed fifth in the team competition. Ugrin finished tenth in the all-around final and seventh in the floor exercise final. She won the bronze medal in the uneven bars final behind her teammate Rizzelli and France's Louise Vanhille.

Senior

2014 

At the 1st Italian Serie A, Ugrin finished eleventh in the all-around, and her club, Artistica 81, finished seventh. Then at the 2nd Serie A, Ugrin had the second-highest score on the balance beam as her club finished sixth. At the 3rd Serie A, Ugrin had the second-highest score on the floor exercise and the fourth-highest all-around total, and Artistica 81 finished fifth. A foot injury kept her out of further competitions in 2014.

2015 
Ugrin and Artistica 81 won the silver medal at the 1st and 2nd Serie A, both times behind Brixia. Then at the 3rd Serie A, they finished third behind Brixia and Lissone. At the City of Jesolo Trophy, the Italian team won silver, and she placed twentieth in the all-around. Then at the 4th Serie A, Ugrin had the highest score in the all-around with a total of 56.500, and Artistica 81 finished second behind Brixia. She then competed at the Four Nations Trophy- a competition between Italy, Russia, Romania, and Colombia. The Italian team finished second behind Russia, and Ugrin finished eleventh in the all-around.

Ugrin was then selected to represent Italy at the 2015 European Games with Giorgia Campana and Alessia Leolini, and they placed fifth in the team competition. Individually, Ugrin finished fifth in the all-around final and sixth in the uneven bars final. At the Golden League, Artistica 81 finished third behind Brixia and Lissone. In the event finals, Ugrin finished fifth on vault, sixth on uneven bars, and fourth on the balance beam.

At the 2015 Italian Championships, Ugrin won her second all-around national title. She then competed at the Novara Cup where the Italian team won the silver medal behind Romania. She was then selected to compete at the World Championships alongside Erika Fasana, Vanessa Ferrari, Carlotta Ferlito, Lara Mori, and Elisa Meneghini. The team finished seventh in the team final, and Ugrin finished fourteenth in the all-around final.

2016-present 
Artistica 81 finished fifth at the 2016 1st Seire A. Then at the 2nd Serie A, Ugrin had the second-highest score in the all-around and on uneven bars and the highest score on the balance beam, and her club finished second behind Brixia. She then competed at the 2016 City of Jesolo Trophy where the Italian team finished third behind the United States and Brazil. Ugrin finished eleventh in the all-around and seventh in the uneven bars event final. Ugrin withdrew from the 2016 Olympic Test Event due to minor injuries. Artistica 81 finished second at both the 3rd and the 4th Serie A. At the Italian Championships, Ugrin only competed on the uneven bars and balance beam, and she finished fifth in the uneven bars event final. In August, Ugrin had surgery on her foot, which took her out of contention for the 2016 Olympic Games.

Since 2017, Ugrin has only competed domestically in the Serie A on the uneven bars and the balance beam.

Competitive history

References

External links 
 

1998 births
Living people
Italian female artistic gymnasts
Sportspeople from Trieste
Gymnasts at the 2015 European Games
European Games competitors for Italy